John Sylvester (born 6 October 1969) is a Grenadian cricketer. He played in twenty first-class and twenty List A matches for the Windward Islands from 1992 to 2003.

See also
 List of Windward Islands first-class cricketers

References

External links
 

1969 births
Living people
Grenadian cricketers
Windward Islands cricketers